The Northeastern Huskies men's basketball team represents Northeastern University, located in Boston, Massachusetts, in NCAA Division I basketball competition. The team has competed in the Colonial Athletic Association since 2005 and has won two tournament titles, having previously played in the America East Conference, where they won seven tournament titles. The Huskies currently play home games at the 6,000-seat Matthews Arena. Since 2006, the Huskies have been coached by Bill Coen.

Current Team

Roster
As of January 1, 2023.

Coaching Staff

Season-by-Season

Postseason

NCAA Division I tournament results
The Huskies have appeared in the NCAA Division I tournament nine times. Their combined record is 3–9.

NCAA Division II tournament results
The Huskies have appeared in the NCAA Division II tournament five times. Their combined record is 7–5.

NIT results
The Huskies have appeared in the National Invitation Tournament (NIT) three times. Their combined record is 0–3.

CBI results
The Huskies have appeared in the College Basketball Invitational (CBI) one time. Their record is 1–1.

Huskies in the NBA
Five former Huskies players have gone on to play in the NBA.
 J. J. Barea (Undrafted, 2006 NBA draft, Dallas Mavericks)
 Harry Barnes (37th pick, 1968 NBA draft, San Diego Rockets
 Reggie Lewis (22nd pick, 1987 NBA draft, Boston Celtics)
 Perry Moss (69th pick, 1982 NBA draft, Boston Celtics
 Rick Weitzman (110th pick, 1967 NBA draft, Boston Celtics)

References

External links